Battle of Toulouse may refer to:

 Battle of Toulouse (439) between the Visigoths and the Western Roman Empire
 Battle of Toulouse (458) between the Visigoths and the Western Roman Empire
 Battle of Toulouse (721) between the Duchy of Aquitaine and the Umayyad Caliphate 
 Battle of Toulouse (844) during the Carolingian civil war
 Battle of Toulouse (1814) during the Napoleonic Wars